The Cambodian Second League organized by the Football Federation of Cambodia. There are seven teams in the competition, each team played on a home-and-away round-robin basis. The top four teams progressed to the play-off round, and the two teams in the finals promoted to 2018 Cambodian League. Two teams (FFC Academy and National Defense Ministry Youth) among seven teams cannot go through to the 2018 Cambodian League, due to FFC Academy is the team founded by FFC and National Defense Ministry Youth and National Defense Ministry FC played in the top Cambodian League are under the same club.

League table

Knockout stage

Quarter-finals

Semi-finals

Final

Awards

 The player of the season: Sieng Chanthea of FFC Academy
 Top goal scorer: Nuth Sinoun of Visakha FC (18 goals)
 The goalkeeper of the season: Chea Vansak of Visakha FC
 The coach of the season: Hok Sochivorn of Visakha FC

See also
 2017 Cambodian League
 2017 Hun Sen Cup

References
 

Cambodian Second League seasons
2017 in Cambodian football